Front-runner is a term to describe the leader in a race, whether in politics, sports or a beauty pageant.

It may also refer to:

 Front Runner, a sailboat
 FrontRunner, a commuter rail train in Utah
 Frontrunners, a collective name for the worldwide network of LGBT running and walking clubs
FrontRunners, a group of Indigenous Canadian athletes
 The Front Runner (film), a political drama
 The Front Runner (novel), a 1974 gay novel by Patricia Nell Warren from which LGBT running and walking clubs derived their name
 Frontrunner, a 2008 documentary about Massouda Jalal's campaign for the presidency of Afghanistan
 Front Runner UGV - unmanned ground vehicle, made in Israel
 FrontRunner, a railroad boxcar model built by TTX Company
 Front Runner, a Stan Rogers song from the 1978 album: Turnaround